Wiltse is a surname. Notable people with the surname include:
 Cadwallader Jackson Wiltse (1823–1900), American politician
 David Wiltse (b. ?), American playwright
 Dottie Wiltse Collins (Dorothy Wiltse Collins, 1923–2008), American baseball player
 Gilbert C. Wiltse (1838–1893), American naval officer
 Hal Wiltse (1903–1983), American baseball player
 Hooks Wiltse (George Leroy Wiltse, 1879–1959), American baseball player
 Mark Wiltse (born 1988), American soccer player
 Snake Wiltse (Lewis DeWitt Wiltse, 1871–1928), American baseball player